The 2001 AVC Cup Women's Club Tournament was the 3rd staging of the AVC Club Championships. The tournament was held in Ho Chi Minh City, Vietnam.

Final standing

References
Asian Volleyball Confederation

V
A
V